Kionna Jeter (born 1997) is an American basketball player. She was drafted in the third round of the 2021 WNBA draft by the Las Vegas Aces. She plays the Point Guard position.

Jeter grew up in Spartanburg, South Carolina, where she attended Spartanburg High School.

Jeter originally signed to play at Coastal Carolina University before transferring to Gulf Coast State, where she played for one year.

From Gulf Coast State, Jeter transferred to Towson University, where she played for three years. She was the 2020-21 Colonial Athletic Association preseason player of the year and was the first Towson player to earn three consecutive all-CAA first team selection as well as back-to-back CAA all-defensive team honors. She led Towson to the NCAA tournament in 2019.

Jeter was the first Towson player to be drafted into the WBNA. She was waived by the Aces before the start of the 2021 season.

References

External links
Towson Tigers bio

1997 births
Living people
American women's basketball players
Basketball players from South Carolina
Guards (basketball)
Gulf Coast State College alumni
Junior college women's basketball players in the United States
Las Vegas Aces draft picks
Sportspeople from Spartanburg, South Carolina
Towson Tigers women's basketball players